The New Orleans Musica da Camera was founded in 1966, by Milton G. Scheuermann, Jr, and is the oldest surviving Early Music organisation in the United States.  They perform music of the Middle Ages and the Renaissance, using historically informed performance techniques and reproductions of period instruments, and have appeared in concert throughout the Gulf South.  Indeed, Professor Scheuermann has built many of their instruments.

The award-winning ensemble, with Professor Scheuermann and Thaïs St Julien as Co-Directors, was the inspiration for the 1998 Mardi Gras parade of the Krewe of Orpheus, and is Visiting Artist in Residence at Our Lady of Prompt Succor National Shrine, home to the miraculous statue.

In 1994, Miss St Julien founded the women's vocal ensemble of Musica da Camera, Vox Feminæ.  Since 1976, the Co-Directors were hosts of "Continuum," the oldest continuing radio program devoted to Early Music in the USA.  It is heard over WWNO, the local NPR affiliate, as well as the World Wide Web.  The MdC's recordings on Centaur were widely hailed, and in 2009, they launched their own label, Belle Alliance.

In 2017, following the late St Julien's illness, Musica da Camera ceased performing.  They now concentrate on their radio program.

Discography 

 "Satires, Desires & Excesses" (1992) Centaur
 "Natus est" (1994) Centaur
 "The Cross of Red" (1996) Centaur
 "Maiden, Mother, Muse" (1998) Centaur
 "Les motés d'Arras" (2000) Centaur
 "Ah, Sweet Lady" (1974-2009) Belle Alliance

External links
 The Musica da Camera's web-site:  

Early music groups
Musical groups from Louisiana
Musical groups established in 1966
1966 establishments in Louisiana
Musical groups from New Orleans